Ricardo Otxoa Palacios (30 August 1974 – 15 February 2001) was a Spanish cyclist.

Career
Otxoa turned professional with  after riding with the team as a stagiaire the previous year. He stayed on the team for three years, and rode as an amateur in 1999. In 2000, he returned to the professionals, and joined  with his twin brother, Javier.

He rode in the 2000 Giro d'Italia, finishing 42nd overall.

Death
On 15 February 2001, Otxoa and his twin brother Javier were hit by a driver of car during a training ride near Málaga. Ricardo was killed, while his brother survived, facing severe injuries and a coma. 

The Circuito de Getxo has also been held as the Memorial Ricardo Otxoa in memory of Otxoa.

Major results
1999
 3rd Overall Volta a Lleida
2000
 3rd GP Llodio

References

1974 births
2001 deaths
Sportspeople from Barakaldo
Cyclists from the Basque Country (autonomous community)
Spanish male cyclists
Cycling road incident deaths
Road incident deaths in Spain
Spanish twins
Twin sportspeople